Plum Pictures was an American independent film production company founded in 2003 by Galt Niederhoffer, Celine Rattray and Daniela Taplin Lundberg. Based in downtown Manhattan, the company produced up to five films a year, with a focus on both independent and studio films. Plum also financed up to two films a year.

The company's film Grace is Gone received two awards at the 2007 Sundance Film Festival, including the Audience Award and the Screenwriting Award.

Films
The Baxter (2005)
Lonesome Jim (2005)
The Ground Truth (2006)
Return to Rajapur (2006)
Dedication (2007)
Grace is Gone (2007)
Great World of Sound (2007)Raving (2007)Watching the Detectives (2007)Bart Got a Room (2008)Birds of America (2008)Diminished Capacity (2008)Trucker (2008)After.Life'' (2009)

References

2003 establishments in New York City
2009 disestablishments in New York (state)
American companies established in 2003
American companies disestablished in 2009
American independent film studios
Companies based in Manhattan
Defunct film and television production companies of the United States
Entertainment companies based in New York City
Mass media companies based in New York City
Mass media companies established in 2003
Mass media companies disestablished in 2009